The 2006–07 season was AS Monaco FC's 50th season in Ligue 1. They finished Ninth in Ligue 1, and were knocked out of the Coupe de la Ligue by Stade Reims, at the Round of 16, and the Coupe de France by Sochaux also at the Round of 16.

Monaco replaced coach Francesco Guidolin with László Bölöni at the start of the season, before firing Bölöni in October with the club sitting 19th in the league. Laurent Banide was appointed as the replacement for Bölöni.

Squad
As of May 20, 2007

Out on loan

Transfers

Summer

In:

Out:

Winter

In:

Out:

Competitions

Ligue 1

League table

Results summary

Results by round

Results

Coupe de la Ligue

Coupe de France

Statistics

Appearances and Goals
 

|-
|colspan="14"|Players away from the club on loan:

|-
|colspan="14"|Players who appeared for Monaco no longer at the club:

|}

Goal scorers

Disciplinary Record

References

External links

Monaco
AS Monaco FC seasons
AS Monaco
AS Monaco